Thomas Lebherz (born 26 June 1963) is a retired German backstroke swimmer who won a gold medal in the 4 × 100 m medley relay at the 1985 European Aquatics Championships. Between 1979 and 1986 he won six national titles in the 100 m and 200 m backstroke events. His son, Yannick Lebherz (b. 1989) is also a competitive swimmer.

References

1963 births
Living people
German male swimmers
Male backstroke swimmers
European Aquatics Championships medalists in swimming